The 1993 Tercera División play-offs to Segunda División B from Tercera División (Promotion play-offs) were the final playoffs for the promotion from 1992–93 Tercera División to 1993–94 Segunda División B. The first four teams of each group (excluding reserve teams) took part in the play-off.

Group A-1

Group A-2

Group A-3

Group A-4

Group B-1

Group B-2

Group B-3

Group B-4

Group C-1

Group C-2

Group C-3

Group C-4

Group D-1

Group D-2

Group D-3

Group D-4

Group E

See also
1992–93 Tercera División

External links
Futbolme.com

Tercera División play-offs
2